Campo Maior, Piauí is a municipality in the state of Piauí in the Northeast region of Brazil.

Its Catedral Santo Antônio, dedicated to Saint Anthony, is the cathedral episcopal see of the Roman Catholic Diocese of Campo Maior.

See also 
 List of municipalities in Piauí

References 

Municipalities in Piauí